Avenir sportif de La Marsa Women's Volleyball Club (Arabic: نادي المستقبل الرياضي بالمرسي للكرة الطائرة النسائية, English: El Marsa Future Association Club or ASM) is a Tunisian women's Volleyball team based in La Marsa, Tunis Town. It is part of AS Marsa Women's main section since 1944 and currently playing in the Tunisian Women's Volleyball League Top Division. The club won the Tunisian Championship for 6 consecutive years from 1974 to 1979 and the Tunisian Volleyball Cup Crown 7 consecutive times (8 total).

Honours

National titles 

 Tunisian Volleyball League 6 :
 Champions : 1973–74, 1974–75, 1975–76, 1976–77, 1977–78, 1978–79
 Vice Champion :

 Tunisian Volleyball Cup 8 :
 Champions : 1973–74, 1975–76, 1976–77, 1977–78, 1978–79, 1979–80, 1980–81, 1981–82
 Runners Up : 1971–72, 1974–75

Current squad 2017–18

See also 
AS Marsa
AS Marsa (volleyball)

References

External links 
 Official Website
 Official Facebook Page

Tunisian volleyball clubs
Volleyball clubs established in 1944
1944 establishments in Tunisia